National Printing Office (NPO) is one of 3 Recognized Government Printers in the Philippines (together with Bangko Sentral ng Pilipinas and the Apo Production Unit). It was first established in 1901 as the Philippine Bureau of Printing. It is an instrumentality of the Government entrusted with the tasks of printing and binding routine Government publications, public documents, the Official Gazette, and other official forms.

History
On November 7, 1901, the Philippine Commission enacted Act No. 296 to create the Bureau of Printing as the pioneer of the Philippine printing industry. Throughout its history, the Bureau has been placed under different government offices. It was initially under the Department of Public Instruction until 1918, when it was placed under the Department of Finance. In 1947, it was transferred to the Office of the President and nine years later in 1958, it was placed under the Department of General Services.

In 1986, under the presidency of Corazon Aquino through the virtue of Executive Order No. 285, the Bureau was merged with the printing unit of the Philippine Information Agency to form the National Printing Office. Through the same order, it was placed under the Office of the Press Secretary, which is today known as the Presidential Communications Operations Office and under which the NPO remains today.

The first Director of the Bureau of Printing was John Sylvannus Leech. Under his term, the Apprenticeship System was adopted in the Bureau to train future printers in the agency's operations. Among the apprentices who benefited from this program was Pablo Lucas, who went on to be the first Filipino Director of Printing.

Functions 
The NPO has printing jurisdiction over the:
Printing, binding, and distribution of all Standard and Accountable Forms of the National and Local Governments, including Government-Owned and Controlled Corporations
Printing of Official Ballots; and
Printing of public documents such as the Official Gazette of the Republic of the Philippines, the General Appropriations Act, Philippine Reports and development information materials of the Philippine Information Agency.

Together with other recognized government printers, the NPO is tasked with the printing of Accountable Forms and Sensitive High Quality/Volume requirements of the government. Besides the other jobs listed above, the NPO may also accept other government printing jobs, including government publications. However, these are engaged in a non-exclusive basis.

Officials 
The NPO is currently headed by Director Carlos A. Bathan (2022). He leads the following officials: 

 Carlos A. Bathan (2022), Deputy Director
 Engr. Neil L. Macaraeg, Acting Superintendent, and Acting Chief of the Engineering Division
 Florante M. Fadul, Acting Assistant Superintendent
 Yolanda B. Marcelo, Acting Chief of the Administrative Division
 Adriano C. Gabriel, Acting Chief of the Financial Management Division
 Buenaventura G. Gonzales, Jr., Acting Chief of the Production, Planning, and Control Division
 Engr. Benedicto M. Cabral, Chief of the Composing Division
 Teresita G. Carvajal, Acting Chief of the Photolithographic Division
 Efren P. Villaluz, Acting Chief of the Press Division
 Engr. Rolando L. Caluag, Acting Chief of the Sales and Management Division
 Napoleon G. Gonzalez, Acting Chief of the Finishing Division
 Jean Paul C. Melegrito, Chief of the Records Section
 Joseph J. Ereno, Chief of the Cashier Section

References

1901 establishments in the Philippines
State publishers